Tanner Vilbon Nicholas Boser (born August 2, 1991) is a Canadian mixed martial arts (MMA) fighter who is currently signed to the UFC Ultimate Fighting Championship. He has mostly fought as a heavyweight, with occasional bouts as a light heavyweight. He had previously competed for Unified MMA, where he won the Unified MMA Heavyweight Championship twice. He has also competed in M-1 Global and King of the Cage.

Background 
Boser was born and raised in Bonnyville, Alberta, Canada, by a gym owner mother and oil field worker father. Tanner was homeschooled until high school. He has a brother, Landon, who is also a professional mixed martial artist. He trained karate for almost a decade while growing up, reaching a black belt in the discipline. After graduating from high school, Boser worked in the local oilfield industry.

Mixed martial arts career

Early career
Without any real training besides his karate background, Boser made his professional mixed martial arts debut in 2012. After the victory in his debut, Boser started training Brazilian jiu-jitsu for his sophomore bout which he won via recently learned submission skills.

In 2013 he moved to Edmonton, Alberta to pursue his mixed martial arts career while working as a bouncer for six years. After scraping by financially for a while in 2016, Boser decided to focus on other options and took an Emergency Medical Technician course with hopes of becoming a paramedic. However the hunger to compete would bring him back to training MMA full time, leading to Boser traveling around the world competing in 9 different countries.

Over the next seven years, he earned a respectable record of 16–5–1. During this time he became a two-time Unified MMA Heavyweight Champion and defending the belt three times. and has also fought around the world. Promotions such as fighting for Absolute Championship Akhmat and M-1 Global has taken him to Kazakhstan, Russia, United Arab Emirates, England and Australia. Having previously defended his Heavyweight Championship for the third time, when Boser was offered to sign with the Ultimate Fighting Championship in 2019.

Ultimate Fighting Championship
In his debut, Boser was set to face Brazilian competitor Giacomo Lemos on July 27, 2019 at UFC 240 in Edmonton, Alberta. However his debut would be delayed as his opponent tested positive for a banned substance and the fight was called off due to a ruling from the United States Anti-Doping Agency.

Boser's debut eventually took place on October 18, 2019 at UFC on ESPN 6 against Daniel Spitz. He won the bout via unanimous decision earning him his first victory in the promotion.

Boser next faced Ciryl Gane on December 21, 2019 at UFC Fight Night 165. He lost the fight via unanimous decision.

Boser was scheduled to face Jeff Hughes on March 28, 2020 at UFC on ESPN: Ngannou vs. Rozenstruik. However, the event was cancelled due to the COVID-19 pandemic.

Returning to action amidst the COVID-19 pandemic, Boser faced Philipe Lins at UFC on ESPN: Poirier vs. Hooker on June 27, 2020. He won the fight via knockout in the first round. This win earned him the Performance of the Night award.

As the first fight of his new four-fight contract, Boser next faced Raphael Pessoa at UFC on ESPN: Whittaker vs. Till on July 26, 2020. Boser won the fight via technical knockout in round two. This win earned him the Performance of the Night award.

Boser was expected to face Andrei Arlovski on October 4, 2020 at UFC on ESPN: Holm vs. Aldana. However a sickness with Arlovski pushed the bout to UFC on ESPN: Santos vs. Teixeira. Boser lost the fight via unanimous decision.

Boser faced Ilir Latifi on June 5, 2021 at UFC Fight Night: Rozenstruik vs. Sakai. He lost the fight via split decision.

As the first fight of his new, four-fight contract Boser faced Ovince Saint Preux on June 26, 2021 at UFC Fight Night 190.
 He won the fight via knockout in the second round.

Boser was scheduled to face Sergei Pavlovich on December 4, 2021 at UFC on ESPN 31. However due to travel issues, the bout was scrapped.

Boser was scheduled to face Rodrigo Nascimento on April 23, 2022, at UFC Fight Night 205. However, Nascimento withdrew from the event for unknown reasons, and he was replaced by Alexander Romanov. In turn Boser was out of the fight due to an injury.  He was replaced by Chase Sherman.

Boser was rebooked against Rodrigo Nascimento for September 17, 2022 at UFC Fight Night: Sandhagen vs. Song. Boser lost the fight via split decision.

Boser is scheduled to face Ion Cuțelaba in a light heavyweight contest on April 15, 2023, at UFC on ESPN 44.

Championships and accomplishments
Ultimate Fighting Championship*
Performance of the Night (One time)
Unified MMA
Unified MMA Heavyweight Champion (two times, three defenses)

Mixed martial arts record

|Loss 
|align=center|20–9–1
|Rodrigo Nascimento
|Decision (split)
|UFC Fight Night: Sandhagen vs. Song 
|
|align=center|3
|align=center|5:00
|Las Vegas, Nevada, United States
|
|-
|Win
|align=center|20–8–1
|Ovince Saint Preux
|KO (punches)
|UFC Fight Night: Gane vs. Volkov 
|
|align=center|2
|align=center|2:31
|Las Vegas, Nevada, United States
|
|-
|Loss 
|align=center|19–8–1
|Ilir Latifi
|Decision (split)
|UFC Fight Night: Rozenstruik vs. Sakai 
|
|align=center|3
|align=center|5:00
|Las Vegas, Nevada, United States
|
|-
|Loss
|align=center|19–7–1
|Andrei Arlovski
|Decision (unanimous)
|UFC on ESPN: Santos vs. Teixeira
|
|align=center|3
|align=center|5:00
|Las Vegas, Nevada, United States
|
|-
|Win
|align=center|19–6–1
|Raphael Pessoa
|TKO (punches)
|UFC on ESPN: Whittaker vs. Till 
|
|align=center|2
|align=center|2:36
|Abu Dhabi, United Arab Emirates
|
|-
| Win
| align=center|18–6–1
| Philipe Lins
| KO (punches)
| UFC on ESPN: Poirier vs. Hooker
| 
| align=center|1
| align=center|2:41
|Las Vegas, Nevada, United States
| 
|-
| Loss
| align=center|17–6–1
| Ciryl Gane
| Decision (unanimous)
| UFC Fight Night: Edgar vs. The Korean Zombie
| 
| align=center|3
| align=center|5:00
| Busan, South Korea
| 
|-
| Win
| align=center|17–5–1
| Daniel Spitz
| Decision (unanimous)
| UFC on ESPN: Reyes vs. Weidman
| 
| align=center|3
| align=center|5:00
| Boston, Massachusetts, United States
| 
|-
| Win
| align=center|16–5–1
| Jared Kilkenny
| TKO (leg kicks)
| Unified MMA 37 
| 
| align=center|4
| align=center|2:17
| Enoch, Alberta, Canada
| 
|-
| Draw
| align=center| 
| Zaur Gadzhibabayev
| Draw (majority)
| M-1 Challenge 101: Prikaza vs. Rakhmonov
| 
| align=center| 3
| align=center| 5:00
| Almaty, Kazakhstan
| 
|-
| Loss
| align=center|15–5
| Salimgerey Rasulov
| Decision (unanimous)
| ACB 90: Vakhaev vs. Bilostenniy
| 
| align=center|3
| align=center|5:00
| Moscow, Russia
| 
|-
| Win
| align=center|15–4
| Chase Gormley
| Decision (unanimous)
| ACB 88: Barnatt vs. Celiński
| 
| align=center|3
| align=center|5:00
| Brisbane, Australia
| 
|-
| Win
| align=center| 14–4
| DJ Linderman
| Decision (unanimous)
| ACB 81: Saidov vs. Carneiro
| 
| align=center| 3
| align=center| 5:00
| Dubai, United Arab Emirates
| 
|-
| Win
| align=center| 13–4
| Dave Cryer
| KO (punches)
| ACB 72: Makovsky vs. Sherbatov
| 
| align=center| 2
| align=center| 4:19
| Montreal, Quebec, Canada
| 
|-
| Loss
| align=center|12–4
| Denis Smoldarev
| Decision (unanimous)
| ACB 61: Balaev vs. Bataev
| 
| align=center| 3
| align=center| 5:00
| Saint Petersburg, Russia
| 
|-
| Loss
| align=center| 12–3
| Mukhamad Vakhaev
| Decision (split)
| ACB 54: Supersonic
| 
| align=center| 3
| align=center| 5:00
| Manchester, England
| 
|-
| Win
| align=center| 12–2
| Rakim Cleveland
| Decision (unanimous)
| Unified MMA 29
| 
| align=center| 3
| align=center| 5:00
| Edmonton, Alberta, Canada
| 
|-
| Win
| align=center| 11–2
| Joey Yager
| Decision (unanimous)
| Unified MMA 28
| 
| align=center| 5
| align=center| 5:00
| Edmonton, Alberta, Canada
| 
|-
| Win
| align=center| 10–2
| Tony Lopez
| Decision (unanimous)
| Unified MMA 27
| 
| align=center| 3
| align=center| 5:00
| Montreal, Quebec, Canada
| 
|-
| Loss
| align=center| 9–2
| Kazbek Saidaliev
| Decision (unanimous)
| Akhmat Fight Show 18
| 
| align=center| 3
| align=center| 5:00
| Grozny, Russia
| 
|-
| Win
| align=center| 9–1
| Tim Hague 
| KO (elbows)
| Unified MMA 26
| 
| align=center| 2
| align=center| 2:30
| Edmonton, Alberta, Canada
| 
|-
| Win
| align=center| 8–1
| Victor Valimaki
| TKO (leg kicks)
| Unified MMA 24
| 
| align=center| 2
| align=center| 3:33
| Edmonton, Alberta, Canada
|
|-
| Win
| align=center| 7–1
| Jared Henderson
| TKO (elbows)
| KOTC: Mach 3
| 
| align=center| 1
| align=center| 3:54
| Edmonton, Alberta, Canada
|
|-
| Loss
| align=center| 6–1
| Tim Hague
| KO (punches)
| Unified MMA 22
| 
| align=center| 1
| align=center| 0:06
| Edmonton, Alberta, Canada
| 
|-
| Win
| align=center| 6–0
| Jordan Tracey
| TKO (punches)
| Unified MMA 20
| 
| align=center| 3
| align=center| 2:39
| Edmonton, Alberta, Canada
| 
|-
| Win
| align=center| 5–0
| Nick Campbell
| Submission (rear-naked choke)
| Unified MMA 18
| 
| align=center| 2
| align=center| 3:33
| Edmonton, Alberta, Canada
| 
|-
| Win
| align=center| 4–0
| William Carriere
| Decision (unanimous)
| Xcessive Force FC 3
| 
| align=center| 3
| align=center| 5:00
| Grande Prairie, Alberta, Canada
| 
|-
| Win
| align=center| 3–0
| Matthew Swimmer
| TKO (punches)
| KOTC: Anger Therapy
| 
| align=center| 1
| align=center| 2:32
| Edmonton, Alberta, Canada
|
|-
| Win
| align=center| 2–0
| Dell Knebush
| Submission (rear-naked choke)
| Unified MMA 16
| 
| align=center| 1
| align=center| 3:03
| Edmonton, Alberta, Canada
|
|-
| Win
| align=center| 1–0
| Mike Cobey
| TKO (punches)
| Unified MMA 13
| 
| align=center| 3
| align=center| 3:44
| Edmonton, Alberta, Canada
|
|-

See also
 List of Canadian UFC fighters
 List of current UFC fighters
 List of male mixed martial artists

References

External links
 
 

1991 births
Canadian practitioners of Brazilian jiu-jitsu
Canadian male mixed martial artists
Heavyweight mixed martial artists
Canadian male karateka
Mixed martial artists utilizing Shitō-ryū
Mixed martial artists utilizing Brazilian jiu-jitsu
Living people
People from the Municipal District of Bonnyville No. 87
Sportspeople from Alberta
Ultimate Fighting Championship male fighters